Coleophora didymella is a moth of the family Coleophoridae. It is found in southern France and Italy.

The larvae feed on Centaurea scabiosa. They create a large, dark yellow-brown, composite leaf case of 15–17 mm long. It is composed of two leaf fragments placed behind each other. The case is laterally compressed and the mouth angle is about 20°. Larvae can be found from summer to the next spring.

References

didymella
Moths described in 1899
Moths of Europe